In Mandaean cosmology, Hiṭpun (Hiṭfun) or Hiṭpon (Hiṭfon) is a great dividing river separating the World of Darkness from the World of Light. It is mentioned in Hymn 25 of the third book of the Left Ginza. The river of Hiṭfon is analogous to the river Styx in Greek mythology and Hubur in Mesopotamian mythology.

It is also known as hapiqia mia or hafiqia mia, which means "streams/springs of water" or "outflowing water." The water is fresh, and is located in a realm that is situated between Abatur's and Yushamin's realms.

In Mandaean scriptures
The Scroll of Abatur has many illustrations of boats ferrying souls across this river.

According to the 1012 Questions, masiqta rituals are needed to guide departed souls across the river and into the World of Light.

See also
Shahrat
Piriawis
Hubur in Mesopotamian mythology
Styx in Greek mythology
Gjöll in Norse mythology
Vaitarna River (mythological) in Hinduism
Yomotsu Hirasaka in Shinto cosmology
Sanzu River in Japanese Buddhist mythology
Kalunga line in Kongo mythology

References

Mythological rivers
Mandaean cosmology